Zbigniew Włodkowski (born 30 April 1961 in Pisz) is a Polish politician. He was elected to the Sejm on 25 September 2005, getting 2842 votes in 35 Olsztyn district as a candidate from the Polish People's Party list. He was MP from 2005 to 2007 and from 2011 to 2015.

See also
Members of Polish Sejm 2005-2007

External links
Zbigniew Włodkowski - parliamentary page - includes declarations of interest, voting record, and transcripts of speeches.

1961 births
Cardinal Stefan Wyszyński University in Warsaw alumni
Living people
People from Pisz
Members of the Polish Sejm 2005–2007
Polish People's Party politicians
Mayors of places in Poland